Naum Rogozhin was a Soviet actor. Honored Artist of the RSFSR (1935).

Biography 
Naum studied at the Faculty of Law at Kharkov University since 1900 to 1904. Since 1901 he played at the People’s House in Kharkov. Since 1904 he played in the troupe of V.F. Komissarzhevskaya in St. Petersburg, and after that in various theaters of St. Petersburg, Moscow, Kiev and other cities. In 1924 he began acting in films.

Selected filmography 
 1924 — Aelita
 1936 — Dawn of Paris
 1938 — Alexander Nevsky

References

External links 
 Наум Рогожин on kino-teatr.ru

Soviet male actors
Male actors from the Russian Empire
National University of Kharkiv alumni
1879 births
1955 deaths